The 2019–20 National Basketball League (Bulgaria) season was the 79th season of the Bulgarian top basketball league.

On 13 March 2020, the Bulgarian government halted the league until 13 April 2020, due to the COVID-19 pandemic. On 16 April 2020, after a month of suspension, the Bulgarian Basketball Federation officially ended the 2019–20 season, after video conference vote of board of directors. Balkan ended the season first, with eighteen wins, but the title was not assigned.

Teams 

Chernomorets from the second league joined the same nine teams from the previous season.

Regular season
In the regular season, teams played against each other three times home-and-away in a double round-robin format. The eight first qualified teams advance to the playoffs.

League table
The season was finished after 19 played games for each team.

Results

Bulgarian clubs in European competitions

NBL clubs in regional competitions

References

National Basketball League (Bulgaria) seasons
Bulgarian